Matthew P. Beebe (September 4, 1833 – October 27, 1901) was an American businessman and politician.

Born in Chester, New York in Warren County, Beebe moved to Portville, New York in 1851. Then, in 1852, Beebe moved to Mineral Point, Wisconsin and finally to Wausau. Beebe was in the logging and lumber business. In 1889, Beebe served in the Wisconsin State Assembly and was a Democrat. Beebe died in Wausau, Wisconsin.

Notes

1833 births
1901 deaths
People from Warren County, New York
Politicians from Wausau, Wisconsin
Businesspeople from Wisconsin
19th-century American politicians
19th-century American businesspeople
Democratic Party members of the Wisconsin State Assembly